The Government Inspector is a 2005 television drama based on the life of David Kelly (played by Mark Rylance) and the lead-up to the Iraq War in the United Kingdom. It was written and directed by Peter Kosminsky, and won three BAFTAs – Best Actor for Rylance, Best Single Drama and Best Writer (as well as being nominated for the BAFTA for Best Original Television Music for Jocelyn Pook, and winning a RTS Television Award for Best Single Drama).

Cast
Mark Rylance as David Kelly 
Jonathan Cake as Alastair Campbell 
Emma Fielding as Susan Watts 
Daniel Ryan as Andrew Gilligan 
Geraldine Alexander as Janice Kelly
Georgina Rylance as Rachel Kelly 
James Larkin as Tony Blair 
Julian Wadham as Jonathan Powell 
Pip Torrens as John Scarlett 
Kayvan Novak as Qasim Hamdani
Philip Bowen as Sir Kevin Tebbit 
Barnaby Kay as Tom Kelly 
Tom Beard as Godric Smith 
Darren Morfitt as Daniel Pruce 
Martin Maynard as Paul Hammill 
Geoffrey Freshwater as Andrew MacKinlay

References

External links

Films directed by Peter Kosminsky
2005 television films
2005 films
British television films
Iraq War in television
Cultural depictions of Tony Blair
Films scored by Jocelyn Pook